Black Music is the first album by Chocolate Genius. It was released on V2 Records on July 14, 1998.

Track 5, "My Mom", is about a return visit to his childhood home and the mother he was losing to senility ("My mom, my sweet mom/She don't remember my name.").

The song "Life" was used in the final episode of season 2 of Breaking Bad.

Background and recording
Just prior to recording Black Music, Chocolate Genius had finished reading The Alexandria Quartet by Lawrence Durrell. In an email interview with Cleveland Scene, Chocolate Genius explained the meaning of the album's title: "As long as my skin is this color, race will be an unavoidable and hindering label for people that are stuck in that archaic mindset. Of course, I take a special pride in the achievements of people that look like me, but I am foremost a citizen of the planet. Calling the first record Black Music was my way of challenging the people who have to file, sell, and categorize music by genre."

Critical reception

Spin called it "a relentlessly somber, wryly confessional avant-folk-funk rebuttal to popular notions of what constituted African-American pop." Many other critics have also highlighted the album's morose and starkly autobiographical sound.

Track listing
 Life
 Half A Man
 Don't Look Down
 Clinic
 My Mom
 Safe And Sound
 A Cheap Excuse
 Hangover Five
 Hangover Nine
 Stupid Again
 It's All Good
 Half A Man (Acoustic Version)

References

1998 debut albums
Chocolate Genius, Inc. albums
V2 Records albums